Posyet may refer to:

 Konstantin Posyet, a Russian statesman and admiral
 Posyet Bay, a bay in the south-western part of the Peter the Great Gulf
 Posyet, a port and urban-type settlement in Primorsky Kray.